The First Battle of the Corunna Road took place between 29 November and 3 December 1936 during the Spanish Civil War. The Nationalists tried to isolate Madrid from the west, cutting the Corunna Road, but the Republican army repelled the attack.

Background
After the failure to take Madrid in November 1936 and the failure to reduce the morale of the city's population through aerial bombing, Franco decided to encircle the city from the north-west in order to cut off water and electricity supplies from the Sierra de Guadarrama.  Franco's Nationalists, led by José Varela, concentrated a force of 3,000 men supported by heavy artillery including Ju 52 bombers.  The defending Republican army had one brigade.

The battle
The Nationalist offensive started on 29 November with heavy artillery bombing on the Pozuelo sector with 3,000 Legion and Moroccan colonial troops backed by tanks and Ju 52 bombers. The Republican brigade was initially routed in disorder, but just a few days later a Republican counter-attack backed by T-26 tanks, re-established the line on 3 December.

Aftermath
The Nationalists only occupied Boadilla del Monte and Villanueva de la Cañada and failed to cut Madrid from the north. They then decided to concentrate a huge force in order to continue the offensive which was recommenced on 13 December and continued into mid-January the following year in the Second Battle of the Corunna Road.

See also 

 List of Spanish Republican military equipment of the Spanish Civil War
 List of Spanish Nationalist military equipment of the Spanish Civil War

References

Corunna Road
1936 in Spain
Corunna Road
Corunna Road
November 1936 events
December 1936 events